In enzymology, a diethyl 2-methyl-3-oxosuccinate reductase is an enzyme that catalyzes the chemical reaction

diethyl (2R,3R)-2-methyl-3-hydroxysuccinate + NADP+  diethyl 2-methyl-3-oxosuccinate + NADPH + H+

Thus, the two substrates of this enzyme are diethyl (2R,3R)-2-methyl-3-hydroxysuccinate and NADP+, whereas its 3 products are diethyl 2-methyl-3-oxosuccinate, NADPH, and H+.

This enzyme belongs to the family of oxidoreductases, specifically those acting on the CH-OH group of donor with NAD+ or NADP+ as acceptor. The systematic name of this enzyme class is diethyl-(2R,3R)-2-methyl-3-hydroxysuccinate:NADP+ 3-oxidoreductase.

References

 

EC 1.1.1
NADPH-dependent enzymes
Enzymes of unknown structure